José Feliciano has recorded 56 studio albums, most of which are primarily sung in either English or Spanish. Three of his releases (Feliciano!, Feliciano/10 to 23, and Alive Alive O!) received the standard Gold certification from the Recording Industry Association of America for sales of 500,000 units. Two of his other albums were awarded Los Premios de Oro y De Platino from the RIAA: Señor Bolero went double Platinum in 2004 for surpassing sales of 120,000 units, and José Feliciano y Amigos went Gold in 2008 after selling 30,000 copies.

Feliciano has also enjoyed more than 50 years of hit singles in countries around the world. Although his biggest English-language hit, "Light My Fire", reached the top ten on the pop charts in the US, Canada, and the UK, it is his Christmas song "Feliz Navidad" that has returned to the charts in several countries every holiday season for much of the new millennium.

Albums

Studio albums

Live albums

Compilation albums

Christmas album chart entries: 1973—present
In 1970 Feliciano released a self-titled album of Christmas songs, one of which was "Feliz Navidad". The album spent four weeks on Billboard'''s Christmas Albums chart in December 1973 and did not chart again in the US under that title. When it was reissued in 2001, it was retitled Feliz Navidad and began appearing on the magazine's album charts during the 2017 Christmas season.

José Feliciano

Feliz Navidad

Video releases
 Purely Music: Live in Germany 1988 (1988, LaserDisc)
 A Legend in Concert: A PBS Special Event (1999, VHS)
 Guitarra Mia: Un Tributo a José Feliciano (2000, VHS)
 Ayer, Hoy y Siempre (2003, DVD)
 New Morning: The Paris Concert by the José Feliciano Band (2009, DVD)
 José Feliciano en Vivo: Puerto Rico'' (2009, DVD)

Singles

1960s

1970s

1980s

1990s–present

"Feliz Navidad" chart entries: 2007–present
"Feliz Navidad" was certified Platinum in Australia by ARIA in 2022.

Notes

References

Bibliography

External links
 

Discographies of American artists
Discographies of Puerto Rican artists
Latin pop music discographies
Pop music discographies